The 2004–05 Austrian Cup was the 71st season of Austria's nationwide football cup competition. It started on September 14, 2004 with the first game of the First Round. The final was held at the Ernst-Happel-Stadion, Vienna on 1 June 2005.

The competition was won by Austria Vienna after beating Rapid Wien 3–1. Austria Vienna qualified for the second qualifying round of the 2005–06 UEFA Cup as cup winners.

First round

|-
|colspan="3" style="background-color:#fcc;"|

|-
|colspan="3" style="background-color:#fcc;"|

|}

Second round
The Bundesliga clubs entered at the Second round, except Rapid Wien, Grazer AK and Pasching who were involved in European competition and given a bye to Round 3. The games were played on September 28 to October 4, 2005.

The match featuring Rapid Wien Am. and SV Mattersburg had to be abandoned at half time due to floodlight failure. It was replayed in full on December 10.

|-
|colspan="3" style="background-color:#fcc;"|

|-
|colspan="3" style="background-color:#fcc;"|

|-
|colspan="3" style="background-color:#fcc;"|

|-
|colspan="3" style="background-color:#fcc;"|

|}

Third round

|-
|colspan="3" style="background-color:#fcc;"|

|-
|colspan="3" style="background-color:#fcc;"|

|-
|colspan="3" style="background-color:#fcc;"|

|}

Quarter-finals

Semi-finals

Final

See also
 2004–05 Austrian Football Bundesliga
 2004–05 Austrian First League

References

External links
 Austrian Cup 2004-2005
 RSSSF Page

Austrian Cup, 2004-05
Austrian Cup seasons
2004–05 in Austrian football